Paige Rini (born 14 March 2000) is a Canadian water skier.

She competed at the 2019 Pan American Games where she won bronze medals in the tricks, slalom and overall events.

She is the stepdaughter of water-skier Whitney McClintock.

References

2000 births
Living people
Canadian water skiers
People from Kissimmee, Florida
Water skiers at the 2019 Pan American Games
Pan American Games bronze medalists for Canada
Pan American Games medalists in water skiing
Medalists at the 2019 Pan American Games